Nussenzweig or Nussenzveig is a surname in the German language. Notable people with the surname include:

Nussenzweig 
Michel C. Nussenzweig (born 1955), American biologist
Ruth Sonntag Nussenzweig (1928–2018), Austrian-Brazilian immunologist

Nussenzveig 
Helena J. Nussenzveig Lopes, Brazilian mathematician
Herch Moysés Nussenzveig (1933–2022), Brazilian physicist

Jewish surnames
German-language surnames
Yiddish-language surnames
Surnames of Brazilian origin